Odile Bihan (born 23 March 1963) is a French swimmer. She competed in the women's 200 metre breaststroke at the 1980 Summer Olympics.

References

External links
 

1963 births
Living people
Olympic swimmers of France
Swimmers at the 1980 Summer Olympics
Place of birth missing (living people)
French female breaststroke swimmers